Uakit is a rural locality (a settlement) in Bauntovsky District, Republic of Buryatia, Russia. The population was 415 as of 2010. The locality has 13 streets.

Geography 
Uakit is located in the area of lake Busani, 97 km north of Bagdarin (the district's administrative centre) by road.

References

Rural localities in Bauntovsky District